Lennie Michael James (born 11 October 1965) is a British actor, screenwriter, and playwright. His work includes playing Morgan Jones in the television series,  The Walking Dead and in its spin-off, Fear the Walking Dead, and starring as DCI Tony Gates in Line of Duty series one.

Among James' more notable roles in television is Glen Boyle in the medical drama Critical on Sky 1. On American television, he portrayed the mysterious Robert Hawkins in the CBS series Jericho and Detective Joe Geddes in the AMC television series Low Winter Sun.

James created and starred in Sky Atlantic drama series Save Me which was released in 2018 to critical acclaim. Its second season, titled Save Me Too, won the BAFTA TV Award for Best Drama Series 2021.

Early life
James was born in Nottingham, the son of Afro-Trinidadian parents. He lived in South London and attended school at Ernest Bevin College. James' mother, Phyllis Mary James, died when he was 10, after which he and his brother, Kester, chose to live in a children's home instead of being sent to the United States to reside with a relative. James remained in foster care for eight years.

James aspired to be a professional rugby player as a teen, and was introduced to acting after following a girl he was interested in to an audition for a play. James attended the Guildhall School of Music and Drama, graduating in 1988. While there, he helped run a campaign against the school's plan to expel another student, which he has said is the bravest thing he's ever done. "That involved being taken in front of the head and threatening to boycott a big event for the Lord Mayor, even though the head said it would mean they would throw me out," James said in 2015. He was once employed by the British government's social security office.

Career

James has appeared in more than 20 films, including Les Misérables (1998), Snatch (2000), 24 Hour Party People (2002), Sahara (2005), and Outlaw (2007). He starred in the 2010 film Tic and appeared in the action film Colombiana (2011) and the sci-fi film Lockout (2012).

On television, James appeared in the short-lived Channel 4 prison drama Buried (2003), the BBC terrorism drama The State Within (2006), the BBC spy drama Spooks (2002–2011), and he starred as Robert Hawkins in the CBS post-apocalyptic drama series Jericho (2006). James appeared in a Channel 4 television drama Fallout (2008), playing the role of a detective alongside another detective solving a teen-related murder. He also appeared in an episode of Lie to Me, as well as the 2009 AMC/ITV miniseries The Prisoner, of which he said, "It wasn’t necessarily the easiest gig I’ve ever been on, but it was always acting." He appeared in HBO's comedy series Hung as a pimp.

James appeared in episodes of the 2010 TV series Human Target as the assassin Baptiste. In 2012, he received critical acclaim for his appearance as DCI Tony Gates in BBC Two's Line of Duty, created by Jed Mercurio.

In 2010, he guest-starred as Morgan Jones in the pilot episode of the AMC series The Walking Dead, titled "Days Gone Bye". In 2013, he reprised his role as Morgan Jones in an episode of the third season of The Walking Dead titled "Clear." On 12 October 2014, James made his return to the show in a post-credit scene at the end of the fifth-season premiere and appeared again in a single scene at the end of the mid-season finale on 30 November 2014. He returned for the fifth-season finale and played a significant role in the episode. Despite his few appearances on the show, James has received significant recognition for his portrayal of Morgan from critics and fans, including being stopped by a policeman who wanted to talk to him about the show. He returned as a main cast member in the show's sixth season until the eighth season. As of 15 April 2018, James appears as Morgan in the fourth season of Fear the Walking Dead as a series regular.

On 29 March 2015, James' character was featured throughout the fifth-season finale. The actor's post-show appearance on the Talking Dead—in which he did not speak with an American accent—caused the hashtag #morganisbritish to trend on Twitter.

James stars as Dr. Boyle on the medical drama Critical, also created by Mercurio, which debuted on Sky 1 in February 2015. He spent nearly a year away from his home in Los Angeles to film the series. Each episode takes place in "real time," with the medical staff having to save a life in an hour. James spent a week shadowing doctors at a London hospital to prepare for the role.

James said his favorite television show of all time is the 1980s police drama Hill Street Blues, telling the Daily Express, "It’s the one that spawned every other show. It’s the Muhammad Ali or Pelé of television shows."

James wrote the autobiographical TV film, Storm Damage in 2000, which was nominated for a British Academy Television Award for Best Drama Series. Storm Damage depicts a teacher who tries to go back to the foster home he left and help the teenagers there, as James did. He also wrote the play The Sons of Charlie Paora, which opened at London's Royal Court Theatre in 2004.

James has also portrayed the Destiny and Destiny 2 character Lord Shaxx who is the host of the in-game PVP (Player Versus Player) "The Crucible" in which he voices over matches and also has an in game vendor to purchase items, and bounties. In an interview with GameSpot, Lennie stated his favorite line in the game, was in fact a line straight out of Shakespeare's Romeo and Juliet. The line in question is in game as "But soft! What light through yonder window breaks? It is the east, and I--I am the Crucible."

Personal life
James lives in Los Angeles, California with wife Giselle Glasman. They have three daughters together. He is the main cook for his family and has professed a fondness for Caribbean cuisine. He is a fan of Tottenham Hotspur FC and Valencia Club de Fútbol (from Spain).

James is among the celebrities who have penned an open "letter to my younger self" for The Big Issue magazine. In his letter in March 2015, he wrote about the pain of losing his mother at a young age. "It hit me quite strongly. It had just been the three of us: my brother, my mum and me. Everything changed when the terrible thing happened. It had a profound, fundamental effect on me. One disappointment is that I never knew my mum as an adult," he wrote.

James also works as a mentor to black inner-city children, and says he rejects the importance people attach to fame and celebrity. "Boys and men in our community need to be aware of the guy who gets up every morning and goes to the job that he doesn't necessarily love, in order to support his family. They are the heroes my community need to celebrate," he said.

Filmography

Film

Television

Video games

Stage

Awards and nominations

References

External links

 Lennie James bio at CBS
 
 Lennie James: Letter to My Younger Self at the Big Issue

1965 births
Black British male actors
Black British writers
English dramatists and playwrights
English male film actors
English people of Trinidad and Tobago descent
English male television actors
English male voice actors
English expatriates in the United States
Living people
Actors from Nottingham
People educated at Ernest Bevin College
Male actors from Nottinghamshire
20th-century English male actors
21st-century English male actors
British male film actors
British people of Trinidad and Tobago descent
British male television actors
British expatriates in the United States
20th-century British male actors
21st-century British male actors
National Youth Theatre members
English male dramatists and playwrights
Writers from Nottingham